Etablissement René Neymann is a French company founded in 1850 that makes matzah and unleavened bread. It is the oldest company of unleavened bread operating in France. The general manager is Jean-Claude Neymann, who represents the 5th generation of managers of this familial and artisanal company.

History 

Etablissement René Neymann was founded in 1850 in Odratzheim by Salomon Neymann. In 1870, Salomon Neymann and his son, Benoit Neymann, moved to Wasselonne. In 1930, the firm began to sell unleavened bread to the non-religious public. The production stopped during the Second World War, René Neymann restarted the company in 1948.

Today, this company exports about 62% of its production. It also produces some (between 20 and 30% of the production) organic goods.

References 

Food and drink companies of France
Food and drink companies established in 1850
Matzo
Companies based in Grand Est